The individual member states of the African Union (AU) coordinate foreign policy through this agency, in addition to conducting their own international relations on a state-by-state basis. The AU represents the interests of African peoples at large in intergovernmental organizations (IGO's); for instance, it is a permanent observer at the United Nations' General Assembly.

Other intergovernmental organizations
Membership of the AU overlaps with other IGO's, and occasionally these third-party organizations and the AU will coordinate matters of public policy.

Political
Non-Aligned Movement (Every AU member state, except South Sudan and the Sahrawi Arab Democratic Republic)

Commonwealth of Nations:

Botswana 
Cameroon
Eswatini
Gabon
The Gambia
Ghana
Kenya
Lesotho
Malawi
Mauritius
Mozambique
Namibia
Nigeria
Rwanda
Seychelles
Sierra Leone
South Africa
Tanzania
Togo
Uganda
Zambia

Regional
Arab League:

Egypt
Sudan
Libya
Morocco
Tunisia
Algeria
Mauritania
Somalia 
Djibouti
Comoros
Eritrea

Arab Maghreb Union:

Algeria
Libya
Mauritania
Morocco
Tunisia

Community of Sahel-Saharan States:

Libya
Burkina Faso
Mali
Niger
Chad
Sudan
Central African Republic
Eritrea
Djibouti
The Gambia
Senegal
Benin
Côte d'Ivoire
Egypt
Ghana
Guinea-Bissau
Liberia
Morocco
Nigeria
Sierra Leone
Somalia
Togo
Tunisia

Conseil de l'Entente:

Côte d'Ivoire
Benin
Burkina Faso
Niger
Togo

Economic
Greater Arab Free Trade Area:

Algeria
Egypt
Libya
Morocco
Sudan
Tunisia

Economic Community of the Great Lakes Countries:

Burundi 
D.R. Congo
Rwanda

G20 developing nations:
 
Egypt
Nigeria
South Africa
Tanzania
Zimbabwe

G-20 major economies:
South Africa
G33:

Benin
Botswana
Democratic Republic of Congo
Côte d'Ivoire
Kenya
Mauritius
Madagascar
Mozambique
Nigeria
Senegal
Tanzania
Uganda
Zambia
Zimbabwe

G90:

Angola
Benin 
Botswana
Burkina Faso
Burundi 
Cameroon
Central African Republic
Chad
Rep. Congo
Côte d'Ivoire
Democratic Republic of the Congo 
Djibouti
Egypt
Gabon
the Gambia
Ghana 
Guinea
Guinea Bissau
Kenya
Lesotho
Madagascar 
Malawi 
Mali
Mauritania 
Mauritius 
Morocco
Mozambique 
Namibia 
Niger
Nigeria 
Rwanda 
Senegal
Sierra Leone 
South Africa 
Swaziland 
Tanzania 
Tunisia 
Uganda 
Zambia
Zimbabwe

Group of 77:

Algeria
Angola 
Benin 
Botswana 
Burkina Faso
Burundi 
Cameroon
Cape Verde 
Central African Republic
Chad 
Comoros
Republic of the Congo
Côte d'Ivoire
Democratic Republic of the Congo 
Djibouti
Egypt
Equatorial Guinea 
Eritrea
Ethiopia 
Gabon
The Gambia 
Ghana 
Guinea
Guinea-Bissau 
Kenya
Lesotho 
Liberia 
Libya
Madagascar 
Malawi
Mali
Mauritania
Mauritius 
Morocco
Mozambique
Namibia
Niger 
Nigeria
Rwanda 
São Tomé and Príncipe
Senegal
Sierra Leone 
Somalia
South Africa 
Sudan
Swaziland 
Tunisia
Uganda 
Tanzania 
Zambia
Zimbabwe

Indian Ocean Commission:

Comoros
Madagascar
Mauritius
Seychelles

Liptako-Gourma Authority:

Burkina Faso, 
Mali
Niger

Mano River Union:

Guinea 
Liberia
Sierra Leone

OPEC:

Algeria
Libya
Nigeria

Linguistic
Community of Portuguese Language Countries:

Angola
Cape Verde
Guinea-Bissau
Mozambique
São Tomé and Príncipe

Organisation internationale de la Francophonie:

Benin
Burkina Faso
Burundi
Cameroon
Cape Verde
Central African Republic
Chad
Comoros
Congo, Democratic Republic of the
Congo, Republic of
Ivory Coast
Djibouti
Egypt
Equatorial Guinea
Gabon
Ghana
Guinea
Guinea-Bissau
Madagascar
Mali
Mauritania
Mauritius
Morocco
Niger
Rwanda
São Tomé and Príncipe
Senegal
Seychelles
Togo
Tunisia

Organization of Ibero-American States:
Equatorial Guinea

Religious
Organisation of Islamic Cooperation:

Algeria 
Benin 
Burkina Faso 
Cameroon 
Chad 
Comoros 
Côte d'Ivoire 
Djibouti
Egypt 
Gabon
The Gambia
Guinea
Guinea-Bissau
Libya
Mali
Mauritania
Morocco
Mozambique
Niger
Nigeria
Senegal
Sierra Leone
Sudan
Somalia
Tunisia 
Uganda

Diplomatic missions

The African Union maintains special diplomatic representation with the United States, European Union, and as of 2022 has plans for a mission to the People's Republic of China.  In 2011, the United States Mission to the African Union donated a state of the art multimedia box to the cash-starved African Union in a formal ceremony, in which they also presented new interns who will be trained to use it.

Foreign relations of constituent states

Algeria
Angola
Benin
Botswana
Burkina Faso
Burundi
Cameroon
Cape Verde
Central African Republic
Chad
Comoros
D. R. Congo
Rep. of the Congo
Côte d'Ivoire
Djibouti
Egypt
Equatorial Guinea
Eritrea
Eswatini
Ethiopia
Gabon
The Gambia
Ghana
Guinea
Guinea-Bissau
Kenya
Lesotho
Liberia
Libya
Madagascar
Malawi
Mali
Mauritania
Mauritius
Morocco
Mozambique
Namibia
Niger
Nigeria
Rwanda
Sahrawi Arab Democratic Republic
São Tomé and Príncipe
Senegal
Seychelles
Sierra Leone
Somalia
South Africa
South Sudan
Sudan
Tanzania
Togo
Tunisia
Uganda
Zambia
Zimbabwe

See also
Enlargement of the African Union
Africa–United States relations
Africa–China relations
Africa–Soviet Union relations
Africa–EU relations
France–Africa relations
Africa–India relations
Africa–Japan relations
Africa–North Korea relations
Africa-South Korea relations
Yugoslavia and the Organisation of African Unity

References